William Holmes (29 October 1926 – 3 December 2020) was an English professional footballer who played as a forward.

Career
Born in Hunslet, Holmes spent his early career with Leeds United and Lancaster City.

Holmes played as an amateur for Wolverhampton Wanderers, before playing with Doncaster Rovers, where he made two appearances in the Football League. He played non-league football with Morecambe, before scoring 16 goals in 21 league games for Blackburn Rovers. After another spell at Morecambe, he signed for Bradford City in September 1953, leaving the club in June 1954 to play for Southport. During his time with Bradford City he made 22 appearances in the Football League, scoring five goals. He also made two appearances for them in the FA Cup.

He was a squad member at the 1952 Olympics, but he did not play in any matches. 

He died on 3 December 2020, at the age of 94.

Sources

References

1926 births
2020 deaths
English footballers
Leeds United F.C. players
Lancaster City F.C. players
Wolverhampton Wanderers F.C. players
Doncaster Rovers F.C. players
Morecambe F.C. players
Blackburn Rovers F.C. players
Bradford City A.F.C. players
Southport F.C. players
English Football League players
Association football forwards